André Luiz Quirino Pereira, commonly known as "André Bambu" (born 4 August 1979), is a Brazilian former professional basketball player.

Professional career
Bambu played pro club basketball with Pinheiros in the top-tier level Brazilian League. With Pinheiros, he won the FIBA Americas League's 2013 season championship.

National team career
Bambu was a member of the senior men's Brazilian national basketball team. With Brazil, he played at the 2006 FIBA World Championship.

References

External links
FIBA Profile
LatinBasket.com Profile
NBB Profile 

1979 births
Living people
2006 FIBA World Championship players
Brazilian men's basketball players
Centers (basketball)
Esporte Clube Pinheiros basketball players
Novo Basquete Brasil players
Power forwards (basketball)